Edgar Bernal Matobato (born 1959) is a self-confessed hitman who claims to be a former member of the Davao Death Squad or the "DDS", an alleged vigilante group tasked to summarily execute suspected criminals.

Senate hearing
Matobato gained international attention when he appeared before the Philippine Senate on September 15, 2016 during a hearing on extrajudicial killings. At the hearing, the 57-year-old assassin narrated his experiences and even revealed names of policemen he worked with in the past. He confessed that he has killed many people, including an alleged terrorist named Sali Makdum. Matobato further recounted that former Davao City Mayor now Philippine President Rodrigo Duterte once emptied an Uzi in killing a certain Hamizola, although the President has denied ties with Matobato and expressed that he doesn't know him.

Matobato says he was among the names listed under Davao city hall’s civil security unit (CSU), which watched over markets, schools, and terminals to keep them safe, although he was considered a "ghost employee." From 1988 to 2013, Matobato said hundreds were killed in the 25-year span of his service to Davao's CSU. Senator Alan Peter Cayetano questioned Matobato, pointing out how in his testimonies, he changed his stance from "pretending to have personal knowledge" to "hearsay."

Arrest
On October 7, 2016, Edgar Matobato was turned over by Senator Antonio Trillanes to the Philippine National Police after an arrest warrant was issued to him.

References

1959 births
Filipino serial killers
Filipino whistleblowers
Living people
Male serial killers
People from Davao City
Prisoners and detainees of the Philippines
Vigilantes